Rathong is a glacier in West Sikkim district of India. It is the source of the Rathong river and extends from Rathong La in the north, to the top of Chowrikiang Valley in the south. It is fed by Mt. Rathong and the ice falls of the Kabru group of peaks. The Himalayan Mountaineering Institute of Darjeeling has set up a permanent base camp at Chowrikiang to impart ice-craft training in Rathong Glacier. Hence, the glacier is well-known to mountaineers all over the world. At present, due to global warming, the glacier is receding rapidly and a number of glacial lakes have formed.

See also
 List of glaciers

References

Glaciers of Sikkim